Wendy Macpherson is an American ten-pin bowler. She was born on January 28, 1968, in Walnut Creek, California, and currently lives in Henderson, Nevada.

Macpherson captured 20 career titles on the Ladies Pro Bowlers Tour and Professional Women's Bowling Association Tour before the tours folded in the fall of 2003 and was a four-time Bowling Writers Association of America Female Bowler of the Year. She is the all-time leader in career PWBA earnings ($1,232,910 U.S.). She also holds the record for highest earnings in a single PWBA season, with $165,425 in 1997.

Macpherson won her first pro title at age 18 in the U.S. Women's Open, while she was still a high school senior. This made her the youngest PWBA Tour titlist ever, a distinction that stood until 2021, when 17-year old Jillian Martin won a PWBA Tour title. Macpherson remains the youngest player to win a PWBA major event. She has also won the USBC Queens event three times. On July 2, 2006, she became the first female bowler to win a USBC Open Championships title when she fired an 812 series (248-300-264) in the singles competition; it was nine days after the death of her father.

In December 2008, Macpherson was elected to the USBC Hall of Fame for Superior Performance; she was inducted with the 2009 class. She was elected to the PWBA Hall of Fame in 2019, as a member of the first Hall of Fame class since that organization suspended operations in 2003.

Macpherson has also competed in the PBA Women's Series, sponsored by the USBC.  Making the field of 16 for the Bayer Earl Anthony Medford Classic as an alternate in January 2009, she eventually won the title over previous Women's Series champion Stefanie Nation, 199-184.

Macpherson started competing in the Japan Professional Bowling Association (JPBA) in 2004, winning the 2004 JLBC Prince Cup in her first appearance. During her JPBA years, she earned ten JPBA titles, including the 34th ABS Japan Open in 2010, where in the final match she pocketed 10,000,000 Yen (approx. $121,000) as a bonus for bowling a 300 game.

References

External links 
 Wendy Macpherson official website

American ten-pin bowling players
1968 births
Living people